"Sheena Is a Punk Rocker" is a song by American punk rock band Ramones, released in 1977 through Sire Records. Written by front man and lead vocalist Joey Ramone it appears on the band's third studio album Rocket to Russia (1977). The song is well known for its early 1960s influence of surf rock and bubblegum pop that influenced Joey; it has since remained one of the band's most popular songs.

The song first appeared in May 1977 as a single in the UK where it charted at number 22 in the UK Singles Chart. In the US, it was released as a single in July 1977, and reached number 81 in the Billboard Hot 100, and appeared on copies of the second issue of the band's 1977 album Leave Home (replacing the track "Carbona Not Glue"). The track, as well as its B-side "I Don't Care", was remixed and re-released for their third LP Rocket to Russia.

Background
The "Sheena" referred to in the title is in fact the comic book character Sheena, Queen of the Jungle; the idea being that punk rock music would appeal to a savage jungle girl brought to civilization. Joey Ramone said of the track, "To me 'Sheena' was the first surf/punk rock teenage rebellion song. I combined Sheena, Queen of the Jungle, with the primalness of punk rock. Then Sheena is brought into the modern day."

The song is notable for being one of the first to explicitly refer to "punk rock" in its title and lyrics in terms of a subculture.

Reception
The song was ranked at number 5 among the top "Tracks of the Year" for 1977 by NME; it is ranked number 461 on Rolling Stone'''s list of the 500 Greatest Songs of All Time. in 2010, number 457 in 2004, and number 434 in 2021 and is included in the Rock and Roll Hall of Fame's 500 Songs that Shaped Rock and Roll.  Cash Box said that "this combination of grinding guitars, rock nostalgia and Anglophiliac delivery could only belong to the Ramones" and that it "is their slickest effort to date."Record World said that the single "recalls California surf instrumentals, and it could be [the Ramones'] first hit.."

Charts

Cover versions

 Rancid covered the song on the We're a Happy Family tribute album.
 Paul Jones covered it as a single, arranged as a ballad with strings.
 Hüsker Dü covered the song on The Living End, a live collection taken from the band's final tour.
 German punk rock band Die Toten Hosen has a live cover version available on their album Im Auftrag des Herrn.
 Sonic Youth's Thurston Moore and Be Your Own Pet's Jemina Pearl performed their version of the song for the CW show Gossip Girl.
 Love Camp 7 covered the song on the Ramones Maniacs tribute album.
 Yeah Yeah Yeahs cover the song on the album Heroes, a recording for the War Child charity organization.
 New Model Army covered the song during their 2001 tour, shortly after Joey Ramone's death.
 Shonen Knife, the all-female band from Osaka (Japan), covered the song on their 2012 Ramones tribute album Osaka Ramones, with bassist Ritsuko Taneda on vocals.
 Manic Hispanic covered the song as Creeper Is A Low Rider on their 2003 album Mijo Goes to Jr. College.
 Charli XCX covered the song live during the VICE party at New York's Pier 59 Studios in 2016.
 The Vindictives and The Queers each covered the song as part of their covers of the entire Leave Home and Rocket to Russia'' albums, respectively, for Selfless Records.

References

Ramones songs
1977 singles
Songs with feminist themes
Songs written by Joey Ramone
Song recordings produced by Tony Bongiovi
Song recordings produced by Tommy Ramone
Surf rock songs
1977 songs
Songs about comics
Songs about musicians
Songs about punk
Songs about fictional female characters
Sire Records singles